Club Deportivo Anáhuac, commonly known as Anáhuac, was a Mexican professional football club based in Monterrey, Nuevo León. The team only played two seasons as a professional club before being disbanded.

History
After disappearing for some time in the 40s, Monterrey, the only professional football club from Northern Mexico at the time, came back in 1952 and asked to join the Segunda División for the 1952–53 season. It was expected that the Mexican Football Federation would accept Monterrey's application. Nevertheless, the application was rejected after only four teams (Veracruz and Querétaro from Segunda División and Atlante and Marte from Primera División) supported Monterrey's petition.

Due to Monterrey being rejected in professional football, a proposal to create a league with teams from Northern Mexico arose, one of them was Club Deportivo Anáhuac.

After some success as an amateur club, Anáhuac was accepted in the Segunda División for the 1953–54 season, thanks to the efforts of Andrés Blanco, Luis Sada Gorostieta and José Ramón Ballina, and under the condition that the club would pay half of the visiting teams expenses when playing in Monterrey. For their first season as a professional club, Anáhuac was managed by Spaniard José Muguerza.

Anáhuac finished the season in fourth place with 23 points. For the 1954–55 season, the club finished in seventh place. At the end of the 1955 season, Anáhuac went on hiatus due to financial problems, but it never came back.

Records

Season-by-season results

References

Association football clubs established in 1952
1952 establishments in Mexico
Association football clubs disestablished in 1955